The Halsknappane Hills are a group of low rock hills just west of Skorvehalsen Saddle in the eastern part of the Mühlig-Hofmann Mountains, Queen Maud Land. Antarctica. They were mapped by Norwegian cartographers from surveys and air photos by the Sixth Norwegian Antarctic Expedition (1956–60) and named Halsknappane (the neck buttons).

References

Hills of Queen Maud Land
Princess Astrid Coast